The 1984 San Diego mayoral election was held on November 6, 1984 to elect the mayor for San Diego. Incumbent mayor Roger Hedgecock stood for reelection.

Municipal elections in California are officially non-partisan, though some candidates do receive funding and support from various political parties. The non-partisan primary was held June 5, 1984. Roger Hedgecock and Dick Carlson received the most votes and advanced to the November runoff. Hedgecock was reelected with a majority of the votes in the November election.

Candidates
Roger Hedgecock, Mayor of San Diego
Dick Carlson, former news anchorman and savings-and-loan executive 
Nancy Bradshaw, self-employed law clerk
Rich Riel, property manager
Warren Nielsen, businessman
Don Parker, businessman
Robertson Whittemore, real estate attorney
Rose Lynne, retired teacher and perennial candidate
James Wyrick, artist

Campaign
Incumbent mayor Roger Hedgecock stood for reelection for his first full term, having previously been elected to finish Pete Wilson's third term. Maureen O'Connor, who had previously come in second to Hedgecock in the 1983 mayoral election, declined to run. Dick Carlson, a former anchorman and savings-and-loans executive, was considered Hedgecock's main challenger. 

A major issue during the campaign were allegations that Hedgecock's 1983 mayoral campaign benefited from $357,000 in illegal contributions. Carlson, on the other hand, was criticized for being inexperienced in government and for going back on a promises not to use his personal fortune in the campaign.

On June 5, 1984, Hedgecock came in first in the primary with 47.0 percent of the vote, followed by Carlson with 37.7 percent of the vote. The remaining 15.3 percent of the primary vote was scattered among seven minor candidates, none of whom received more than 5 percent individually. Local newspapers interpreted the relatively high vote for the minor candidates as protest votes and an indication that the electorate was dissatisfied with both Hedgecock and Carlson.

Because Hedgecock was short of an overall majority of the vote, he and Carlson advanced to a runoff election scheduled for November 6, 1984. Hedgecock ultimately prevailed in the general election with 57.9 percent of the vote, and was reelected as mayor.

Primary election results

General election results

References

1984
1984 California elections
1984 United States mayoral elections
1980s in San Diego
November 1984 events in the United States